Elise Johnson McDougald (October 13, 1885 – June 10, 1971), aka Gertrude Elise McDougald Ayer, was an American educator, writer, activist and first African-American woman principal in New York City public schools following the consolidation of the city in 1898. She was preceded by Sarah J. Garnet, who became the first African-American woman principal in Brooklyn, New York while it was still considered a separate city. McDougald's essay "The Double Task: The Struggle for Negro Women for Sex and Race Emancipation" was published in the March 1925 issue of Survey Graphic magazine, Harlem: The Mecca of the New Negro. This particular issue, edited by Alain Locke, helped usher in and define what is now known as the Harlem Renaissance. McDougald's contribution to this magazine, which Locke adapted for inclusion as "The Task of Negro Womanhood" in his 1925 anthology The New Negro: An Interpretation, is an early example of African-American feminist writing.

Early life and education
Johnson was born in New York City, where her father, Dr. Peter Augustus Johnson, was one of the first African-American doctors and a founder of the National Urban League.
Her mother was Mary Elizabeth Whittle, an English woman from the Isle of Wight, and her older brother, Travis James Johnson, was the first African-American graduate of Columbia University's College of Physicians and Surgeons in 1908. He was born in Chichester, England, in 1883, and the family moved to New York in 1884. Elise spent her early days growing up in Manhattan, but also spent summers in New Jersey, as her father's family owned a truck farm there. She would later inherit and manage the farm.

Johnson became the first African-American graduate of the Girls' Technical School in 1903, and was elected president of her senior class. 
After graduating from high school, she earned a teaching certificate from the New York Training School for Teachers. She never received her bachelor's degree, although she completed coursework at Hunter College, Columbia University and New York City College.

Career 
Her teaching career began in 1905 at P.S. 11 in lower Manhattan. She resigned from P.S. 11 in 1911 to focus on her family. In 1916 she went back to work as a vocational counselor at the Manhattan Trade School. She then worked as an industrial secretary at the local branch of the National Urban League, where she started a survey documenting the working conditions of New York City's African-American women. The survey was sponsored not only by the Urban League, but also the Women's Trade Union League and the YWCA. Her New Day for the Colored Woman in Industry in NY City, co-authored with Jessie Clark, was published in 1919. Her work as Executive Secretary for the Trade Union Committee for Organizing Negro Workers brought her into contact with other political organizers such as W. E. B. Du Bois.

In March 1925, her essay "The Double Task: The Struggle for Negro Women for Sex and Race Emancipation" was published in the edition of Survey Graphic magazine entitled Harlem: The Mecca of the New Negro (and was reprinted in the 1992 anthology Daughters of Africa, edited by Margaret Busby).

In 1935 she was temporarily appointed principal of P.S. 24 during the times of the Depression, where more than 60% of families and neighborhoods were unemployed. Elise was a part of a community forum of interracial prominent New Yorkers who evaluated the conditions of its city and changes that needed to be made. She testified in the hearings and discussed how she wanted to work to gain the trust of parents, enforce a more relaxed atmosphere, and help provide relief for families struggling.  This activism helped her become one of the first pioneers to originate the Activity Program, which placed a large emphasis on intercultural curriculum. This program implemented child-centered progressive education in New York City's public elementary schools.  The overall idea for this program was to shift the emphasis on the subject matter to the children instead.  Some changes to the schools included experiential learning, self-directed projects, interdisciplinary curriculum, and turn classroom experiments into "democratic living". She later transferred after 10 years to P.S. 119. After her retirement in 1954, she remained active, writing a column in the Amsterdam News on Harlem schools, among other things.

Personal life
Johnson married twice. Her first husband was attorney Cornelius W. McDougald; they divorced. She married her second husband, doctor Vernon A. Ayer, in 1928.

She died at her home on June 10, 1971, at the age of 86. She was survived by her second husband and by two children of her first marriage, Dr. Elizabeth McDougald and attorney Cornelius McDougald Jr.

References 

Educators from New York City
American women educators
1885 births
1971 deaths
African-American feminists
American feminists
African-American educators
Activists from New York City
African-American writers
20th-century African-American women writers
20th-century American women writers
20th-century African-American writers